Ayo District is one of fourteen districts of the province Castilla in Peru.

See also 
 Qallwa
 Qullpa
 Sukna
 Yanawara
 Yanqha

References

Districts of the Castilla Province
Districts of the Arequipa Region